Jenifa's Diary is a Nigerian television comedy series, created by Funke Akindele. The series is part of the Jenifa franchise, based on a naive and funny character of the same name. Jenifa's Diary has 28 seasons and is currently active and ongoing.

Premise
Jenifa’s utterances contain both ‘direct’ and ‘indirect’ speech acts.
The series tells the story of a native village girl Jenifa (played by Funke Akindele) who desperately wants to get out of her ratchet way of life. In her desperation, she leaves her village and goes to the city of Lagos in order to get a proper education. Toyosi, an old friend is left with no choice than to accommodate her despite the visit being unannounced.

Jenifa is unsuccessful with her education but she gets a job at Nikki'o salon on the Island with the help of her friend Kiki, becoming very successful in her hairstyling career.

At Nikki'o salon, she meets another stylist, Segun (played by Folarin 'Falz' Falana), who becomes romantically interested in her. Jenifa resists all his advances citing that she would like to be in a relationship with someone who is above her in status and education. Later Jenifa learns of his plan to visit the United States. He tells her he had been trying to tell her of his intentions and even help her travel out of Nigeria too. With Segun gone, work at Nikki'o salon resumes.

In the premiere episode of season 5, Jenifa meets Marcus, a wealthy businessman. Marcus employs her as a manager in his new salon. Jenifa asks Toyosi to write a resignation letter since she would be leaving Nikki'O. One day, Marcus's wife, Tiana, appears out of the blues. Marcus never told Jenifa of his marital life. When Jenifa along with Adaku and Benny who left Nikki'O with Jenifa in search of greener pastures could not stand Tiana again, they decide to flee back to Nikki'O. Unbeknownst to Jenifa, Adaku and Benny had written a letter for excuse to be away for a while instead of resignation. Jenifa left with no choice goes back to Nikki'O to beg Randy, the manager to employ her back. To her surprise, she is welcomed back with open arms with the news that her demands have been met and her salary has been increased as she asked. Instead of writing a letter of resignation, Toyosi had written a letter for salary increment instead. Jenifa resumes work at Nikki'O. One day, the CEO of Nikki'O called a meeting and had Jenifa, Adaku and Benny fired for their dishonesty.
The informant who had spilled the beans is revealed to be Pelumi, Jenifa’s rival and a hairstylist at Nikki'O.

Cast 
 Funke Akindele as Jenifa
Folarin "Falz" Falana as Segun
Lolo as Adaku
Juliana Olayode as Toyosi
Lota Chukwu as Kiki 
Paschaline Alex Okoli as Cordelia
Aderounmu Adejumoke as Esther
Michael Uba as James
Tobi Makinde as Timini
Jerry Smart Ordu as Randy
Ibinabo Timini’s Sister
Tobi Adebayo as Waheed, Jenifa's younger brother
Chukwuebuka Anyaduba as Chima
Tomike Adeoye As Tania
Joy Nice as Pelumi, the main antagonist and Jenifa's rival.
Tiwa Savage as herself (cameo appearance).
 Nosa Rex as Terwase

Spin-off 
A spin-off called Aiyetoro Town premiered on the 21st of June 2019. It consisted of 18 episodes and was released exclusively on YouTube. It is set in the Jenifa's village, the fictional Aiyetoro Town which just got transformed to a town. It stars Funke Akindele retaining her role as Jenifa and some of her costars from Jenifa's Diary such as Tobi Adebayo as Waheed (Jenifa's younger brother), Tobi Makinde as Timini and some new characters.

A new spin-off was made called Jenifa on Lockdown premiered on the 13 of May 2021. It's an ongoing series and was released YouTube. It is also set in Aiyetoro Town and Jenifa's hair place. It stars Funke Akindele as Jenifa, Paschaline Alix as Cordelia, Tobi Adebayo as Waheed, Tobi Makinde as Timini and many others...

References 

 
 

Nigerian comedy television series
Television shows set in Lagos